The Anschutz Family Foundation is a private foundation based in Denver, Colorado. It was founded in 1982 by Fred and Marian Pfister Anschutz, the parents of Colorado rancher Sue Anschutz-Rodgers, who serves as chair and president, and of Philip Anschutz, a billionaire businessman. Since its founding, it has distributed more than 9,000 grants to nonprofit organizations for a total of $52.6 million as of 2016. The Foundation for a Better Life is funded solely by the foundation.

References

External links
 

Foundations based in the United States
Organizations based in Colorado
Organizations established in 1982